The Moment's Energy is an album by British saxophonist and improvisor Evan Parker's Electro-Acoustic Ensemble recorded at the Lawrence Batley Theatre in 2007 and released on the ECM label.

Reception

The Allmusic review by Thom Jurek awarded the album 4 stars stating "this work is more modern composition than merely free or experimental jazz. This is a gorgeous work when taken as a whole, a musical journey through multi-dimensional landscapes and sonic shadows that seems to stretch time itself."

On All About Jazz John Kelman called it "an album where there's both greater density and delineation, an even broader dynamic scope and, quite simply, one of the most ambitious mixtures of form and freedom, and extant and new-found textures" and "A composition that could never be performed the same way twice, its careful construction of sound in real-time and post-production makes for an ambitiously considered experience of great power and unsettling subtlety".

The Guardian's John Fordam observed "Different combinations of players come to the fore in each piece, which imparts variety to these abstract soundscapes"

The Penguin Jazz Guide called it "a composed piece for improvising ensemble that delivered a work of unparalleled sophistication and presence" noting "the sound-world of the piece is determined to a broad extent by the individual performers, but it is Parker's imagination - capricious responsive but in no way totalizing - that makes the piece so successful ... Though some may cite the ensemble's transatlantic collaboration with Roscoe Mitchell as a greater achievement, this remarkable collaborative work is its masterpiece"

Writing for DownBeat, John Ephland stated: "The earnest, sincere and able execution of this material by seasoned and well-trained artists suggest 'a new chamber orchestra'... There is cohesion and a kind of forward movement here. And their edginess spills over into a kind of frolicking playfulness light years from the energy of so-called free-jazz."

Track listing
All compositions by Evan Parker
 "The Moment's Energy I" - 9:29   
 "The Moment's Energy II" - 9:45   
 "The Moment's Energy III" - 9:34   
 "The Moment's Energy IV" - 4:19   
 "The Moment's Energy V" - 9:23   
 "The Moment's Energy VI" - 8:11   
 "The Moment's Energy VII" - 11:14   
 "Incandescent Clouds" - 5:05

Personnel
 Evan Parker - soprano saxophone
 Peter Evans - trumpet, piccolo trumpet
 Ko Ishikawa - shō
 Ned Rothenberg - clarinet, bass clarinet, shakuhachi
 Philipp Wachsmann - violin, live electronics
 Agustí Fernandez - piano, prepared piano
 Barry Guy - double bass
 Paul Lytton - percussion, live electronics
 Lawrence Casserley - signal processing instrument
 Joel Ryan - sample and signal processing
 Walter Prati - computer processing
 Richard Barrett - live electronics
 Paul Obermayer - live electronics
 Marco Vecchi - sound projection

References

ECM Records live albums
Evan Parker live albums
2009 live albums